Elk Bath is a wildlife photograph by John McColgan, a fire behavior analyst working for the Alaska Fire Service division of the Bureau of Land Management. It was taken on August 6, 2000, on the East Fork of the Bitterroot River on the Sula Complex, Bitterroot National Forest, Montana, United States, and is also sometimes known by the title, Bitterroot Forest Fire or, more vaguely, Montana Fire. When NASA featured it in its online Astronomy Picture of the Day series, it was called Fire on Earth. The image shows two Rocky Mountain elk seeking protection from a wildfire by standing in the river.

It was one of the Time magazine Photographs of the Year 2000, and ran in its The Year in Pictures special edition in winter 2000/2001, and the web equivalent.

McColgan took the photograph with a Kodak DC280 digital camera while standing on a bridge crossing over the East Fork of the Bitterroot River. Several other animals were present off frame, including a deer standing below McColgan as he took the photograph.

References

2000 works
2000 in art
2000 in Montana
Deer in art
Photographs of the United States
Color photographs
Bitterroot National Forest
2000s photographs
Works about Montana
Wildfires in Montana
Landscape photographs